Project 211 was an abolished project of developing comprehensive universities and colleges initiated in 1995 by the former State Education Commission of China, with the intent of raising the research standards of comprehensive universities and cultivating strategies for socio-economic development. The name for the project comes from an abbreviation of the slogan "In preparation for the 21st century, successfully managing 100 universities" (面向21世纪，办好100所高校). One hundred was the approximate number of participating universities.

History 
During the first phase of the project, from 1996 to 2000, approximately US$2 billion was distributed. 

Some universities of Project 211 claimed that the project funding had been ceased in 2013. Since 2014, Project 211 has been mentioned less. In the same year, some universities reported that Project 211 funding had terminated, and the project had been repealed. 

In October 2015, the State Council of P.R.China published the 'Overall Plan for Promoting the Construction of World First-Class Universities and First-Class Disciplines (Double First-Class University Plan)' , and made new arrangements for the development of higher education in China, replacing previous projects including Project 211, Project 985, Project Characteristic Key Disciplines, etc.

In June 2016, the Ministry of Education of China announced that the Project 211 had been abolished and replaced by the Double First-Class University Initiative.

In September 2017, the full list of Double First Class University Plan was formally published by the central government of China, a total number of 140 universities were included in this plan  (the number of Double First-Class Universities expanded to 147 in February 2022), taking up less than 5% of the total number of Chinese higher education institutions (3,012), which represents the most elite part of the higher education in China.

In 2019, the Ministry of Education of China reconfirmed that the invalidated Project 211 had been replaced by the Double First-Class University Plan.

Admissions 
They admit students through a competitive process of the National Higher Education Entrance Examination ("Gaokao") for undergraduate programs.

Sequel 
Since 2015, the Project 211 has been abolished and replaced by the Double First-Class University Initiative. In 2022, the Ministry of Education of China announced that 15 Double First-Class Universities received warnings on their Double First-Class status revocation, and 14 of them are former Project 211 universities. If these 15 universities fail to pass the final assessment in 2023, they will lose their Double First-Class University statuses.

Controversies 
Some Project 211 universities were added into the project for 'poverty alleviation', 'aid the poor', 'ethnic policy' and 'regional balance' reasons, and they were weaker than some other universities beyond the project in terms of comprehensive competitiveness and faculties' development.

List of universities 
By 2008, China had some 116 institutions of higher education (approximately 6%) designated as 211 Project universities for developing to meet some planned scientific, technical, and human resources targets and offering advanced degree programs.

See also

List of universities in China
State Key Laboratories, a list of key laboratories receiving support from the central government of the P.R. China
Double First Class University, a scheme for improving 147 China's top universities
C9 League, a formal group of 9 elite universities in the China
Project 985, a former project of developing 39 leading research universities in China
Excellence League, an alliance of leading Chinese universities with strong backgrounds in engineering
Big Four Institutes of Technology
 Yangtze Delta Universities Alliance
 Plan 111
 863 Program
 Rankings of universities in China
 Small-town Swot

References

External links
Project 211: the 106 universities and colleges (the webpage written in Simple Chinese)
Ministry of Education 211 Project

 
Higher education in China
Universities and colleges in China
211
College and university associations and consortia in Asia
 China Projects